Andalusian Left (in Spanish: Izquierda Andaluza; IA) is an Andalusian nationalist and socialist political party in Andalusia. The party is currently inactive.

History
IA emerged in 1998 as a split of the United Left, from a current of opinion within the coalition called Andalusian Left Collective. IA participated in several electoral processes (like the general and regional elections of 2000), sometimes in coalitions (with the Greens of Andalusia in the elections to the European Parliament of 1999 in the coalition Greens - The Peoples' Left) or with the Socialist Party of Andalusia. In 2008 IA joined Andalusian Coalition.

Elections
 2000 Andalusian parliamentary election: 10,232 votes (0.26%)

References

1998 establishments in Spain
Andalusian nationalist parties
Left-wing nationalist parties
Political parties established in 1998
Political parties in Andalusia
Socialist parties in Spain